This article lists the governors of British South African colonies, including the colonial prime ministers. It encompasses the period from 1797 to 1910, when present-day South Africa was divided into four British colonies namely: Cape Colony (preceded by Dutch Cape Colony), Natal Colony, Orange River Colony and Transvaal Colony.

After the colonies were disestablished as a result of the creation of the Union of South Africa, the area was divided into four provinces of the Union: Cape Province, Natal Province, Orange Free State Province and Transvaal Province.

Cape Colony

Governors

Prime Ministers

Natal Colony

Governors

Prime Ministers

Orange River Colony

Governors

Prime Minister

Transvaal Colony

Governors of the Transvaal

Lieutenant-Governors of the Transvaal

Prime Minister of the Transvaal

See also
High Commissioner for Southern Africa
Commander-in-Chief of British Forces in South Africa
List of administrators of former South African provinces

References

"South Africa: Cape Colony", worldstatesmen.org © Ben Cahoon.
"South Africa: Natal Colony", worldstatesmen.org © Ben Cahoon.
"South Africa: Orange Free State", worldstatesmen.org © Ben Cahoon.
"South Africa: Transvaal", worldstatesmen.org © Ben Cahoon.

External links
World Statesmen – South Africa

South African colonies
Lists of political office-holders in South Africa
Lists of South African people
South Africa history-related lists
Viceroys in South Africa